Mactaquac may refer to:

 Mactaquac Dam, a hydro-electric power generating facility on the St. John River in New Brunswick, Canada
 Mactaquac Provincial Park, a park located on the dam's headpond
 Mactaquac, New Brunswick, unincorporated community in the Fredericton area
 Mactaquac (electoral district), a riding which elects members to the Legislative Assembly of New Brunswick
 Tobique–Mactaquac, a riding which elects members to the Canadian House of Commons